Roaring Creek may refer to:

In North Carolina
Roaring Creek Township, Avery County, North Carolina
Roaring Creek (North Carolina), a tributary of the North Toe River in the above township

In Pennsylvania
Roaring Creek (Pennsylvania), a tributary of the North Branch Susquehanna River
South Branch Roaring Creek, a tributary of the above
Roaring Creek Township, Columbia County, Pennsylvania

Elsewhere
Roaring Creek, Belize, a small village in the Cayo District
Roaring Creek (Tygart Valley River), a stream in West Virginia

See also

Roaring Branch